Konrad Kornek (12 February 1937 – 6 March 2021) was a Polish footballer playing as a goalkeeper. He played in 15 matches for the Poland national football team from 1962 to 1967. At club level, he was best known for his time at Legia Warsaw, and his local professional club Odra Opole,  amassing 197 matches in the top division between the two.

References

External links
 

1937 births
2021 deaths
Polish footballers
Poland international footballers
People from Opole County
Association football goalkeepers
Odra Opole players
Legia Warsaw players
New York Cosmos players